Chan Hon-chung (1909 – March 1991) was a Hung Ga Grandmaster, former producer, choreographer and actor. He was a student of the Chinese martial artist Lam Sai-wing. He was also the founding chairman of the Hong Kong Chinese Martial Arts Association, the most important Chinese martial arts association in Hong Kong.

Early life
Chan was born in 1909 in Hingning, Guangdong. At the age of 19, he arrived in Hong Kong to participate in martial arts training under Lam Sai-wing.

After many years of training, Chan has finally established his own school, the Hon Chung Gymnasium in 1938.

Before setting up his own school, he has helped the Chinese army in Shun Teh county to train army and swordsmen to fight against Japanese invasion in 1936.

Chan entered the entertainment industry in the late 1940s to 1950s and worked as producer, choreographer and actor in the making of his sigung Wong Fei-hung film series which starred Kwan Tak-hing in the titular role .

Hong Kong Chinese Martial Arts Society
In 1969, a group of Chinese martial artists came to Hong Kong from Singapore to discuss holding a Southeast Asia Chinese martial arts competition. 
The leader of the Singapore group suggested Hong Kong should have an association to coordinate and expand the Chinese martial arts community.
Every style and school of Kung Fu agreed it was a good idea and Chan was elected as the chairman of the association.

Chan was awarded a medal by Queen Elizabeth II in 1973 for his leadership and contribution to the Chinese martial arts community. He was the only Chinese martial artist honored by the Queen during colonial Hong Kong.

Incident
The Chairman single handedly fought off four young armed robbers.

It was late in the evening on the Chinese New Year’s Eve in 1973, Chan and his wife were preparing for the new year’s celebration for the next day at his tailor shop. Chan’s wife went checking on the doors when they were about to leave the premises and this was when she faced four robbers with knives and then shouted for help. It was a natural instinct for Chan to stand in front of those armed robbers to protect his wife. The young robbers were surprised to see the fast and powerful fighting skills from this elderly man and within minutes they all fled with injuries. Chan got a slight injury on his belly from this battle but those young robbers were surely not in good shape after the incident.

Death
Chan continued to lead the Hong Kong Chinese Martial Arts Association until he died in 1991.

References

External links 
http://hkmdb.com/db/people/view.mhtml?id=27812&display_set=eng
https://web.archive.org/web/20171011130734/http://hungkuen-jingchung.net/forum/discussion/20/chan-hon-chung-i-demand-perfection
Real Kung fu magazine UK 1 Vol 2 A Kung fu master honored by the Queen

1909 births
1991 deaths
Chinese male martial artists
Chinese Hung Gar practitioners
Sportspeople from Guangdong
Hong Kong male film actors
20th-century Hong Kong male actors